The Mesilla Park Historic District, in Las Cruces, New Mexico, is a historic district which was listed on the National Register of Historic Places in 2016.

It is roughly bounded by Bowman St., Union and University Aves., and Park Drain.

The district includes:
Mesilla Park Elementary School (1907-1963), separately listed on the National Register in 2015
a railroad depot (1925)
St. James Episcopal Church (1911)

See also
La Mesilla, New Mexico
La Mesilla Historic District

References

Historic districts on the National Register of Historic Places in New Mexico
National Register of Historic Places in Doña Ana County, New Mexico
Mission Revival architecture in New Mexico
Pueblo Revival architecture in New Mexico